"Imaginationland Episode II" is the eleventh episode in the eleventh season of Comedy Central's animated television series South Park. It originally aired on October 24, 2007. The episode was rated TV-MA LV in the United States. It is the second episode in a three-part story arc that won the 2008 Emmy for Outstanding Animated Program for One Hour or More. The three episodes were later reissued together, along with previously unreleased footage, as the uncensored Imaginationland: The Movie.

In the episode, Stan and Kyle are captured by the government, and are being held in the Pentagon until they tell them how they got into Imaginationland. Meanwhile, Cartman is on a deranged quest: Find Kyle and have him make good on their bet.

Plot
Butters awakens from his dream where he's home to see that he is still in Imaginationland. A variety of evil creatures burst through the destroyed wall and kill the terrorists who freed them before turning to attack the good creatures. The Mayor urges everyone to flee before he himself is impaled by a Xenomorph. Meanwhile, Cartman has a dream concerning his frustration with Kyle not sucking his testicles, per the conditions of a bet between them that Cartman won.

Butters, the Lollipop King and Snarf from ThunderCats flee through the forest and observe the evil characters torturing and mutilating Strawberry Shortcake. As they discuss her fate, the Woodland Christmas Critters from Cartman's Christmas story appear, suggesting worse forms of torment. They propose forcing her to eat her gouged-out eye, and then giving her AIDS by having someone infected with the disease urinate in her eye socket, before raping and killing her, to the other evil characters' shock. Not knowing of anyone so infected among their number, they set off to find someone with AIDS in the forest.

Meanwhile, Kyle and Stan are interrogated at The Pentagon. They are told of a portal into Imaginationland that had been built during the Cold War and is controlled by the government. It is discovered that the portal powers up when the boys, after trial and error, correctly sing the "Imagination" song that the Mayor sang in the previous episode. The Pentagon decides to send a group of soldiers into Imaginationland, led by Kurt Russell, since his appearance in the film Stargate gives him more experience than anyone else. Before the troops are sent, Cartman breaks into the Pentagon in order for Kyle to suck his balls, as per their bet. After Russell and his troop cross the portal, they encounter the Woodland Critters, who gang rape and kill the soldiers. The resulting emergency alert interrupts Kyle and Cartman before they can carry out the terms of the bet. Then, ManBearPig breaks through the portal into the Pentagon causing havoc before a Pentagon employee manages to reverse the portal, sending ManBearPig back into it, but it sucks Stan through as well, and the energy electrocutes Kyle, leaving him seemingly dead on the portal room floor, but he is revived by Cartman using CPR, though his reasons for doing so are selfishly motivated, purely so Kyle can't "weasel out" of having to suck his balls.

In Imaginationland, Butters arrives at Castle Sunshine and is brought before the Council of Nine, consisting of Aslan, Gandalf, Glinda, Luke Skywalker, Morpheus, Popeye, Wonder Woman, Jesus and Zeus. The council determine that Butters is "the key" to taking back Imaginationland from the evil characters, despite Butters' protestations.

Back in the Pentagon, the general, seeing that their "imaginations have run wild", orders for a nuclear missile to be launched through the portal. At the hospital, Kyle awakens from his coma to find Cartman at his bedside, pleased that Kyle is now free to make good on their bet.

Reception and release

IGN gave the episode a rating of 7.9/10 saying that the "episode definitely feels like the 2nd part of a trilogy that should have been two parts". Josh Modell of The A.V. Club gave the trilogy a B grade, criticizing the slow pace of the main plot and calling it "more like an excuse for a nostalgia trip than a good arc." However, he praised Cartman's endless pursuit of his bet with Kyle and the return of the Christmas critters, calling their appearance, "some of the funniest moments in South Park's recent history".

The Imaginationland Trilogy won the Primetime Emmy Award for Outstanding Animated Program (for Programming One Hour or More).

"Imaginationland Episode II", along with the thirteen other episodes from South Park'''s eleventh season, were released on a three-disc DVD set in the United States on August 12, 2008. The set includes brief audio commentaries by Parker and Stone for each episode. The entire trilogy was released as a standalone film titled Imaginationland: The Movie.

Cultural references
The episode opens with Cartman intoning "Previously, on Battlestar Galactica", over a still of that show's logo.

The resuscitation scene from James Cameron's The Abyss was referenced in the episode.

The scenes with the portal and Kurt Russell are in reference to the movie Stargate. The General references this when saying "You were in that movie that was kinda like this".

"Sunshine Castle" is reminiscent of Rivendell from The Lord of the Rings'' fantasy novel series.

References

External links

 "Imaginationland Episode II" Full episode at South Park Studios
 

South Park episodes in multiple parts
South Park (season 11) episodes
Gang rape in fiction
Demons in television
Cultural depictions of Al Gore
Portrayals of Jesus on television
Wizards in television